Amauli is a village situated in Uttar Pradesh, India. It is one of the 13 block headquarter of Fatehpur District.  Its population is about 15000. There are 50 government and private schools and colleges situated in the 5 km radius of Amauli. One government CHC and many private hospitals are here. There are three branches of nationalized banks located here, these are Punjab National Bank, Bank of Baroda and Central Bank of India. The Postal Index Number (PIN) of Amauli is 212631. All mobile operator services are available here. It is the fourth biggest market of Fatehpur district. It is connected by roadways with all major cities of Uttar Pradesh.

Schools
 Sbgp Inter College Amauli-Fatehpur
 Shri Dulichand Inter College Amauli-Fatehpur
 Ganeshchandra balika Inter College Amauli-Fatehpur
 Sarswati shishu mandir School Amauli-Fatehpur
 Gramin Siksha Sadan Jr. High School Amauli-Fatehpur
 St. Garoor Education Centre
   Amauli - fatehpur
LPD public school amuali fatehpur
 Kids Dream land JHS Anjali Fatehpur

Banks
 Panjab National Bank
 Bank of Baroda
 Central bank of India
 Baroda up gramin bank
 Post bank of India

Other information

References 

Villages in Fatehpur district